The 13th Vuelta a España (Tour of Spain), a long-distance bicycle stage race and one of the three grand tours, was held from 30 April to 15 May 1958. Salvador Botella won the points classification and Federico Bahamontes won the mountains classification.

Teams and riders

Route

Results

References

 
1958
1958 in Spanish sport
1958 in road cycling
1958 Challenge Desgrange-Colombo
April 1958 sports events in Europe
May 1958 sports events in Europe